Viktor Kovalenko or Victor Covalenko or variant, may refer to:

Viktor Kovalenko (footballer) (born 1996), Ukrainian footballer
Viktor Kovalenko (ice dancer) (born 1991), Uzbek ice dancer
Victor Kovalenko (born 1950), Ukrainian–Australian sailing coach
Victor Covalenco (born 1975), Moldovan decathlete

See also
 Kovalenko (surname)
 Victor (disambiguation)